Lakka or  is a liqueur produced in Finland which derives its flavor from the cloudberry fruit.  The word  means cloudberry in Finnish.

The beverage is produced by soaking the berries in alcohol anywhere between two and six months until sweetened, and is branded by Chymos and Lapponia, both of which are distributed by the Sweden-based V&S Group, best known for its Absolut Vodka product.

External links
 Lapponia official website (Finnish/English)
 Chymos Lakkalikööri webpage (Finnish)

Finnish liqueurs